Masterpiece is the 23rd album released by The Isley Brothers on Warner Bros. Records on April 29, 1985. For the first time since 1973, the Isley Brothers were a trio composed of the original members O'Kelly, Rudolph and Ronald Isley. It was the last album with O'Kelly Isley; he died a year after the album's release from a heart attack. The fall of 1985 also saw the elder Isleys release Masterpiece. The album is dedicated to their late brother Vernon Isley and their parents Sally & O'Kelly Isley Sr. The album liner notes were written by Elaine Isley.

Track listing

Personnel
The Isley Brothers
Ronald Isley – lead vocals; harmony vocals on "If Leaving Me Is Easy"
O'Kelly Isley, Jr. – harmony and background vocals; lead vocals on "If Leaving Me Is Easy"
Rudolph Isley – harmony and background vocals

with
Paul Jackson Jr., Dann Huff, David T. Walker – guitar
Robbie Buchanan – keyboards
Randy Kerber – acoustic piano
Ernie Watts, Gary Herbig – saxophone
Neil Stubenhaus, Freddie Washington – bass guitar
John Robinson, Ed Greene – drums
Paulinho da Costa – percussion
Bill Green, Gary Herbig – flute
Plas Johnson – tenor saxophone
Chuck Findley, Gary Grant, Bill Green – trumpet
George Bohanon, Slyde Hyde – trombone
Jerry Hey – horn

Technical personnel & arrangements
Produced by The Isley Brothers (Ronald, Rudolph and O'Kelly Isley)
Arranger, conductor: Gene Page
Concertmaster: Harry Bluestone
Engineer: Michael Mancini
Additional engineers: Bill Spungin, Russell Schmidt
Assistant engineers: Dean Burt, Joe Travers
Mixed by The Isley Brothers
Mastered by Brian Gardner
Art direction by Jeri McManus
Photography by George Holz
Design by Mary Ann Dibs

Chart performance
The album charted at #140 in the US Billboard 200 while only charting at #19 on the R&B album chart. "Colder Are My Nights" peaked at #12 on the R&B charts, while "May I?" charted at #42 in 1986.

Charts

Weekly charts

Year-end charts

References

External links
 The Isley Brothers - Masterpiece (1985) album releases & credits at Discogs
 The Isley Brothers - Masterpiece (1985) album credits & user reviews

1985 albums
The Isley Brothers albums
Albums arranged by Gene Page
Warner Records albums